CESPA may refer to:
Compañía Española de Petróleos (CEPSA), Spanish Petroleum Company
Parity (charity), previously called Campaign for Equal State Pension Ages